Nuruddin Sikandar Shah was the Sultan of Bengal in 1481 CE for a brief number of days.

Early life and background
Sikandar was born in the 15th-century into a ruling class Bengali Muslim Sunni family known as the Ilyas Shahi dynasty, in the Bengal Sultanate. His father, Sultan Nasiruddin Mahmud Shah, was a descendant of Shamsuddin Ilyas Shah - the founder of the ruling dynasty as well as the nation. Hailing from what is now eastern Iran and southern Afghanistan, Sikandar's family was of Sistani ancestral origin.

Reign
Following the death of his nephew, Shamsuddin Yusuf Shah, Sikander rose to the throne though he did not retain this position for long. Historians Abdul Karim, Nizamuddin Ahmad and Ghulam Husain Salim indicate that Sikandar held the title for only a day or two, being removed almost immediately after his ascension because of his "lack of mental equilibrium". Banglapedia considers that Sikandar lost the confidence of the court nobles. Others suggest that his time as Sultan may have lasted for as long as two months.

Legacy
Not much was known about Sikandar Shah for centuries other than a brief mentions of him in texts such as the Riyaz-us-Salatin where he is incorrectly referred to as the son of his predecessor. Recently, coins of Sikandar Shah minted from Dār ad-Darb (Treasury) were discovered in Mathanguri, Baksa, Assam. One coin is preserved in Münzkabinett, Dresden Castle, Germany while three can be found in Bangladesh National Museum, Dhaka.

See also
 List of rulers of Bengal
 History of Bengal
 History of India

References

Sultans of Bengal
Sunni Muslims
15th-century Indian monarchs
Ilyas Shahi dynasty
15th-century Bengalis